Jerron Romalas Wishom (born March 1, 1982) is a former American football cornerback. He was signed by the Houston Texans as an undrafted free agent in 2005. He played college football at Louisiana Tech.

Wishom was also a member of the Green Bay Packers, San Francisco 49ers, Minnesota Vikings, Dallas Cowboys, Montreal Alouettes, Saskatchewan Roughriders, New Orleans VooDoo and Dallas Vigilantes.

Early years
Jerron graduated from Lutcher High School in Lutcher, LA in 2000.

External links
Just Sports Stats

1982 births
Living people
Players of American football from New Orleans
Players of Canadian football from New Orleans
American football cornerbacks
Canadian football defensive backs
American players of Canadian football
Louisiana Tech Bulldogs football players
Houston Texans players
Green Bay Packers players
San Francisco 49ers players
Minnesota Vikings players
Cologne Centurions (NFL Europe) players
Dallas Cowboys players
Saskatchewan Roughriders players
Virginia Destroyers players
Orlando Predators players
Bossier–Shreveport Battle Wings players
New Orleans VooDoo players
Dallas Vigilantes players